Delphin Dougie Jerk Tshiembe (born 7 December 1991) is a Danish/Congolese footballer who plays as a centre-back for Fram Reykjavík.

Club career

HB Køge
On 1 July 2013 it was confirmed that Tshiembe had signed a contract with HB Køge. He played his first match for the club on 25 July 2013 against Lyngby Boldklub. He played the whole match. In March 2014, Tshiembe suffered a bad knee injury, and was out for the rest of the season.

AC Horsens
On 27 January 2016 it was announced that Tshiembe had signed a contract with AC Horsens. He made his debut on 20 March 2016 against Vejle Boldklub. He played 68 minutes, before getting replaced by Jonas Gemmer in a 3–4 defeat in the Danish 1st Division.

Hamilton Academical
On 7 August 2018, Tshiembe signed for Scottish Premiership side Hamilton Academical. He left Hamilton in May 2019.

HB Tórshavn
On 27 February 2020, Tshiembe signed for Faroese club HB Tórshavn who had Danish former player Jens Berthel Askou as head coach. He left the club again at the end of 2020.

Return to HB Køge
On 28 April 2021, Tshiembe returned to HB Køge on a deal for the rest of the season. He left the club at the end of the season.

Vendsyssel FF
Left without contract, Tshiembe signed a deal with Vendsyssel FF on 22 July 2021. He left the club at the end of 2021, as his contract expired.

References

External links
 

1991 births
Living people
Danish expatriate men's footballers
Democratic Republic of the Congo footballers
Democratic Republic of the Congo expatriate footballers
Danish Superliga players
Danish 1st Division players
F.C. Copenhagen players
HB Køge players
AC Horsens players
Hellerup IK players
Hamilton Academical F.C. players
Havnar Bóltfelag players
Vendsyssel FF players
Knattspyrnufélagið Fram players
Faroe Islands Premier League players
Scottish Professional Football League players
Association football midfielders
Danish expatriate sportspeople in Scotland
Danish expatriate sportspeople in Iceland
Expatriate footballers in Scotland
Expatriate footballers in the Faroe Islands
Expatriate footballers in Iceland
Danish people of Democratic Republic of the Congo descent